Kalifornia is Nasty Idols sixth album release after 2009's Boy's town.

Track listing

Personnel
 Andy Pierce - Vocals and acoustic guitar
 Peter Espinoza - Lead guitar and synthesizers
 Dick Qwarfort - Bass
 Rikki Dahl - Drums

Additional musicians:
 Matti Engdahl - Hammond organ (3,11)

References

2012 albums
Nasty Idols albums